Middle of the road may refer to:
A synonym for political centrism
A synonym for moderation or via media ("the middle road")

Music
Middle of the road (music), music style and radio format often abbreviated "MOR"
Middle of the Road (band), 1970s Scottish pop band
"Middle of the Road" (song), 1983 song by The Pretenders
M.O.R. (album), 2007 album by Alabama 3
"M.O.R.", 1997 song by Blur

See also
MOR (disambiguation)